The Brothers are a pair of small islands, East Brother and West Brother, located in the San Rafael Bay embayment of San Pablo Bay,  these roughly  west of Point San Pablo in Contra Costa County, California.

History

The 19th century Mexican Diseño del Rancho de San Pablo, (diseño: a plat map typically used to indicate rancho land grant boundaries in Alta California), names East Brother Island as Isla de Pajaros or "Bird Island." They are shown, labeled "The Brothers", on an 1850 survey map of the San Francisco Bay area made by Cadwalader Ringgold.

After many a court battle, the plans were scrapped.

East Brother Island is home to the East Brother Island Light, a light house and a Victorian house, that is a present-day bed and breakfast.

See also 
 
 List of islands of California

References

External links
 East Brother Light Station

Islands of Contra Costa County, California
Islands of San Francisco Bay
Islands of Northern California
San Pablo Bay
Geography of Richmond, California
Tourist attractions in Richmond, California